Hooterization: A Retrospective is a compilation album by American rock band the Hooters and was released in 1996 by Columbia Records.

Background
Hooterization: A Retrospective contains songs from the Hooters' three albums on Columbia Records: Nervous Night (1985), One Way Home (1987) and Zig Zag (1989).

It also contains two live songs recorded in 1985 that were previously unavailable on the band's albums: a cover version of the Beatles' "Lucy in the Sky with Diamonds" and "Time After Time," which band member Rob Hyman co-wrote with Cyndi Lauper and earned him a Grammy Award nomination for Song of the Year in 1984.

Track listing

Note
Tracks 10 and 15 recorded live at the Tower Theater, Philadelphia, October 20, 1985.

Personnel
Adapted from the album liner notes.

The Hooters
Eric Bazilian – lead vocals, guitar, bass, mandolin, saxophone
Rob Hyman – lead vocals, keyboards, accordion
David Uosikkinen – drums
John Lilley – guitar
Andy King – bass, vocals, lead vocal (track 10)
Fran Smith Jr. – bass, vocals (tracks 7, 11, 12, 16)

Additional musicians
Patty Smyth – vocals ("Where Do The Children Go")
Peter, Paul and Mary – backing vocals ("500 Miles")

Technical
Rick Chertoff – producer
Eric Bazilian – co-producer (One Way Home, Zig Zag)
Rob Hyman – co-producer (One Way Home, Zig Zag)
William Wittman – engineer, mixing (Nervous Night)
John Agnello – engineer (Nervous Night, Zig Zag)
Phil Nicolo – engineer (One Way Home, Zig Zag)
Dave Thoerner – engineer, mixing (One Way Home), mixing ("And We Danced")
Rod O'Brien – engineer (One Way Home)
Steve Churchyard – mixing (Zig Zag) 
George Marino – mastering
Chris Athens – digital remastering
Josh Cheuse – art direction

Notes 

The Hooters albums
1996 compilation albums
Columbia Records compilation albums
Albums produced by Eric Bazilian
Albums produced by Rob Hyman
albums produced by Rick Chertoff